Ensign Peak is a peak in the foothills near downtown Salt Lake City, Utah. On July 26, 1847, Brigham Young and other early members of the Church of Jesus Christ of Latter-day Saints (LDS Church) climbed this hill to survey the Salt Lake Valley. The hill has religious significance in LDS Church history, as Brigham Young remarked on that day that the peak was a fitting place to "set up an ensign". 

Ensign Peak Advisors is an investment manager for assets of the LDS Church and is named after Ensign Peak.


See also
 Mormon Historic Sites Foundation
 "High on the Mountain Top"

Notes

Further reading
. An address giving some background information on Ensign Peak.

External links

 

Mountains of Salt Lake County, Utah
Mountains of Utah
The Church of Jesus Christ of Latter-day Saints in Utah
Wasatch Range
Significant places in Mormonism